Miris is type genus of mirid bugs belonging to the family Miridae, subfamily Mirinae. The genus  was first described in 1794 by Johan Christian Fabricius.

Species
The Pan-European species directory and BioLib list:
 Miris nebrodensis Carapezza, 1991
 Miris persicus (Reuter, 1876)
 Miris striatus (Linnaeus, 1758) - type species (as Cimex striatus L., 1758)

Species in this genus are largely found in Europe, having been collected in Germany, Bulgaria, Netherlands and France; there are also records from the British Isles, Scandinavia and western Russia.

References 

Mirinae
Miridae genera
Hemiptera of Europe
Taxa described in 1794
Taxa named by Johan Christian Fabricius